Ilhéu dos Mosteiros is an uninhabited islet in the Gulf of Guinea, part of São Tomé and Príncipe. It lies about 0.8 km off the northeast coast of the island of Príncipe. It is 20 metres high. Since 2012, the islet forms a part of Island of Príncipe Biosphere Reserve.

References

Uninhabited islands of São Tomé and Príncipe
Príncipe